Dorsa Burnet are wrinkle ridges at  in Oceanus Procellarum on the Moon. They are about 194 km long and were named after Thomas Burnet by the IAU in 1976.

The dorsa draw near the southwest end of the Montes Agricola, and curve around the western Aristarchus plateau.  The craters Schiaparelli, Golgi, and Zinner lie to the west.

References

Burnet